The Broxbourne Council election, 2010 was held to elect council members of the Broxbourne Borough Council, a local government authority in Hertfordshire, England.

Composition of expiring seats before election

Election results

Results summary 

An election was held in all 13 wards on Thursday 6 May 2010.

The May 2010 election saw the largest number of Liberal Democrat candidates in a Broxbourne election since the whole council was elected in 1999 following the Boundary Commission review.

The Liberal Democrats succeeded in achieving 3rd place in the popular vote despite fielding the smallest number of candidates (9) of any party.

The overall BNP result was the worst achieving by the party in recent years. All of the BNP candidates finished in last place in the 10 wards the BNP contested.

Additionally the BNP share of the vote fell by over 7% when compared with the last Broxbourne Council elections held in 2008.

No seats changed hands in this election.

The new political balance of the council following this election was:

Conservative 35 seats
Labour 3 seats

The next Local Government Election was scheduled to be held on 5 May 2011 when seats will be contested in all of the 13 wards.

In December 2010 Councillor Joanne Welch left the Conservative Group and sat as an Independent member. As a result of this the new political balance of the council was:

Conservative 34 seats
Labour 3 seats
Independent 1 seat

Ward results

References

2010
2010 English local elections
May 2010 events in the United Kingdom
2010s in Hertfordshire